Gedeon Gador Quijano (Alcantara, Cebu, 13 December 1910 – 15 May 1989) was a Filipino politician, governor of Misamis Occidental, and later medical doctor in the United States at Salisbury – W.G. (Bill) Hefner VA Medical Center, U.S. Army Veteran and lawyer.

Life 
He was the son of Bishop Juan P. Quijano and was the second eldest of 9 children and older brother of Gardeopatra G. Quijano, a dentist and writer.  He married Eugenia Tagdulang Quijano, a daughter of a landowner of from Tangub City. Gedeon and Eugenia had three children: Sela Quijano Borromeo, Dr. Zeus Hito T. Quijano, and Dr. Cari T. Quijano – all named after his allies at the time.

Quijano completed his studies at the University of the Philippines, along with his sister Gardeopatra and wife Eugenia. While in school, they all took turns in helping care for his eldest daughter Sela. Although Gedeon grew up as an Aglipayan, being the son of a Bishop of the Philippine Independent Church, his daughter attended Immaculada Concepcion, a Catholic all-girls school at the time. During the war he was recruited as a doctor in the U.S. Army, and his youngest son Cari was born while in hiding from the enemy in the jungle.

Governorship 
As a doctor, Gedeon became very popular in his hometown treating poor people in the rural areas for free and charged only the rich. As a result, he was appointed Governor by President Roxas with Congressman Villarin's recommendation when the position became vacant. Inspired by the admiration of the people he then pursued to widen his political endeavors and ran for governor in his province Misamis Occidental  He won a landslide victory and became the youngest governor.  He served four terms as governor, appointed in 1946, elected in 1947, 1951, and 1959, during a time of progress and growth.  When he tried to run for another term against a wealthy opponent Henry Regalado who was also supported by a millionaire shipping liner owner Congressman William Chiongbian, he realized then it was a very tough competition. And lacking of funds he was forced to finance his political campaign by mortgaging his house. He was defeated and was offered a position under the administration of President Ferdinand Marcos. But he declined because he did not want to betray his faithful supporters by working under the opposite political party affiliation.  Although Gedeon had befriended Marcos, during Marcos's term as Congressman and Senator, he spoke against him as president.  Fearing prosecution Gedeon and Eugenia left the Philippines. They first lived in Virginia for a year and worked in the State Hospital, but he decided to move to Salisbury, North Carolina and accepted a job offer as a physiatrist at the Veteran's Administration Hospital.

Meanwhile, in the Philippines, rumors widely spread that President Ferdinand Marcos would declare martial law. Out of fear, Gedeon advised his children to emigrate to the U.S. before martial law was declared in 1972. He pleaded to the U.S. president and U.S. State Department for his daughter and family to be approved for immigration.  He stayed active in the U.S. to help push for citizenship and benefits for Filipinos who fought in the WWII with American troops.  Two of his grandchildren served in the U.S. military.

After his political career ended Gedeon had served under five presidents, Roxas, Quirino, Magsaysay, Garcia, and Macapagal (President Gloria Macapagal Arroyo's father).  With his growing power in the province, Gedeon was alleged for having 500 personal agents of which he was cleared.  He was the youngest governor of the province, one of the youngest serving governors in the Philippines, and one of longest serving governors.  Gedeon was also a member of the Freemasons.  He returned years later after Martial Law was lifted to his hometown in 1981 where he always wanted to be buried, and while on his last vacation on May 15, 1989, he suffered a stroke.  Gedeon and Eugenia's home still stand in Oroquieta City, Misamis Occidental, and his family now resides in the U.S.

See also 
Gardeopatra G. Quijano
Filipino Veterans Fairness Act
Misamis Occidental
Oroquieta City
Cebuano literature

References

External links 
 Salisbury – W.G. (Bill) Hefner VA Medical Center
 Oroquieta City
 Gedeon Quijano Philippines – Google Book Search
 Salisbury Post
 The Freeman: Governor Gedeon Gador Quijano, Misamis Occidental
 Facebook: Gedeon And Eugenia Quijano Ancestral Home

1910 births
1989 deaths
Members of the Philippine Independent Church
People from Cebu
Governors of Misamis Occidental
20th-century Filipino medical doctors